The 2000 Chinese Jia-A League season is the seventh season of professional association football and the 39th top-tier overall league season in China. It was named the Pepsi Chinese Jia-A League for sponsorship reasons, while the league started on March 19 and ended on October 1, 2000, and saw Dalian Shide win the championship.

Promotion and relegation
Teams promoted from 1999 Jia-B League
Xiamen Xiaxin
Yunnan Hongta

Relegated after end of 1999 Jia-A League
Guangzhou Songri
Wuhan Hongtao K

League standings

Top scorers

See also
Chinese Jia-A League
Chinese Super League
Chinese Football Association Jia League
Chinese Football Association Yi League
Chinese FA Cup
Chinese Football Association
Football in China
List of football records in China
Chinese clubs in the AFC Champions League

References
China - List of final tables (RSSSF)

Chinese Jia-A League seasons
1
China
China
2000 establishments in China